Bnei Ayish is a town and local council in the Central District of Israel.

History
The town was founded in 1957 on land that had belonged to the depopulated Palestinian village of Yasur. Before 1948, the area had served as a military base for British Army troops during the Mandate era. It was named after Rabbi Akiva Yosef Schlezinger, whose name is abbreviated to Ayish.

Bnei Ayish originally served as a transit camp for immigrants from Yemen in the early 1950s. Today its population is almost entirely made up of Jews of Yemenite descent and immigrants from the former Soviet Union .

References

External links
Local council website

Local councils in Central District (Israel)
Populated places established in 1957
1957 establishments in Israel